The Virginia Armada are a professional American football team based in Virginia Beach, Virginia. The team is a member of the Major League Football (MLFB), a public traded professional football league, and plays its home games at Virginia Beach Sportsplex.

The Force are part of the league "Core Four" teams. They are the first pro football team in Virginia since the United Football League Virginia Destroyers.

History
On March 18, 2022, Major League Football launched a new website and revealed that there will be only four teams for the first season. On March 22 the league reveled their second coach in Terry Shea. The league would later reveal he will coach the Virginia Armada.

The Armada started their training camp on July 21. One week later, the team was evicted from its hotel amid unpaid bills and reports of the league shutting down.

Staff

Players

References

2022 establishments in Virginia
American football teams established in 2022
American football teams in Virginia
Sports in Virginia Beach, Virginia